Joel M. Moskowitz is a researcher on the faculty of the School of Public Health at the University of California, Berkeley. He has worked on public health issues that include cell phone risk, tobacco control, and alcohol abuse. He helped the city of Berkeley, California to draft an ordinance mandating safety warnings on cell phones. In 2018, Moskowitz won the James Madison Freedom of Information Award for his work in bringing to light previously publicly unknown California Department of Public Health guidance documents about cell phone safety.

Biography
Moskowitz was educated at Rutgers University (BA in mathematics), University of California, Santa Barbara (MA and PhD in social psychology), and served as a postdoctoral fellow at Northwestern University in evaluation research and methodology.

He is Director and Principal Investigator of the Center for Family and Community Health at the University of California, Berkeley.
Since 2009, Moskowitz has been disseminating research on wireless technology, public health and policy.

Mobile phones

Meta-analysis
Moskowitz coauthored a 2009 meta-analysis of 23 studies of mobile phone usage and risk of tumors, which concluded that studies with low bias revealed "possible evidence linking mobile phone use to an increased risk of tumors."
The Los Angeles Times quoted Moskowitz a few days after the publication of the meta-analysis as stating that he "went into this really dubious that anything was going on.... But when you start teasing the studies apart and doing these subgroup analyses, you do find there is reason to be concerned."
A few months later, Moskowitz's work was mentioned in the Huffington Post by epidemiologist Devra Davis, who stated his findings concurred with other research, and that "the French are not waiting for further research on this matter, and are taking steps based on the notion that it is better to be safe than sorry", and that she and Moskowitz and "experts from a number of countries" agreed with the French approach.
Moskowitz also wrote an op-ed in the San Francisco Chronicle stating that nine nations had issued precautionary warnings about mobile phones, and arguing that "it is time for our government to require health warnings and publicize simple steps to reduce the health risks of cell phone use".

"Right to Know" law

In 2015, the city of Berkeley, California, passed a "Right to Know" law that mandated electronics retailers to warn customers about cellphone hazards. Moskowitz had been involved in creating the law and had testified in its support, and his views were covered in Mother Jones and CNN. Moskowitz described the law as "a crack in the wall of denial.... Look at what happened in 1977 with Berkeley’s smoking law: Things looked pretty bleak, but that led to a national movement." CNN reported that Moskowitz was involved in creating the new mobile phone law, quoting him as stating that the new law's information disclosure requirement went beyond previous regulations by "stating that children and anyone carrying their phone in a pocket or bra could be at increased risk of radiation exposure."

Guideline disclosure lawsuit

In 2016, Moskowitz sued the State of California to force disclosure of mobile phone safety guidelines that it had prepared, but never released. Moskowitz's requests for copies of the guidelines had been repeatedly denied in 2014.  The two-page guidelines included statements that the electromagnetic fields (EMFs) emitted by mobile phones "can pass deeper into a child’s brain than an adult’s," and that "The brain is still developing through the teen years, which may make children and teens more sensitive to EMF exposure."

The California Department of Public Health released copies of the guidelines on March 2, 2017, after a Sacramento Superior Court judge indicated she would order their disclosure, and after the state was told by the San Francisco Chronicle that it was publishing news coverage of the case. 
Stanton Glantz, a prominent researcher on the health effects and control of tobacco, described the history of Moskowitz's legal fight on his blog, noting that the presiding Superior Court Judge Shellyanne Chang tentatively "overruled eight of the nine objections submitted by the state," and directed release of the  guidance document. But

Moskowitz had viewed the stamping of the document, according to KPIX-TV, as "essentially creating a new document rather than producing the document as-is."
Moskowitz's legal victory was later noted by media that included 
the Boston Globe, where he was quoted with reference to the possible withholding of information by the Massachusetts Department of Public Health, as well as by 
The Mercury News, 
KGO-TV, 
KCRA-TV, and
the Huffington Post.

A few months after Moskowitz's legal victory, on December 13, 2017, the California Department of Public Health released an official guidance document about cellphone radiation,
characterized in Huffington Post as an "updated version of the documents the public health department released under pressure."
With regard to the new official guidance document, CNET quoted Moskowitz as stating that "although California's new cell phone warnings underplay the state of the science, many people consider this action by the largest state public health department to be a significant development," and that he "would like to thank the current leadership of CDPH for their courage to stand up to a powerful industry." Moskowitz stated that "one area there is a great improvement is there is a sidebar where it says, 'What about children?'"

James Madison Freedom of Information Award

For his work on cell phone radiation, the Northern California branch of the Society of Professional Journalists gave Moskowitz a 2018 James Madison Freedom of Information Award.
On its website, the journalists' Society noted that "Moskowitz... successfully sued the state under the California Public Records Act, securing the release of a report on cell phone radiation commissioned by California’s Department of Public Health." The University of California reported that Moskowitz was "grateful to more than 200 journalists in 48 countries who reported on the CDPH cell phone safety guidance," and quoted him as stating that

Other activities and coverage

During the 2010s, 
and especially since the mid-2010s, Moskowitz's opinions have frequently been quoted in local 
and national media.
Time magazine quoted Moskowitz saying as a society, "we're basically flying blind" with regard to our cumulative long-term exposures from our wireless gadgets, and
Reader's Digest quoted Moskowitz's opinion that "currently, we’re not doing a good job in regulating radiation from these devices. In fact, we’re doing an abysmal job."
Healthline has quoted Moskowitz's concerns about wireless Bluetooth devices, which "because of the proximity... to the body or the head" can result in exposures "half as much or a third as much as you might get from your cell phone".
IEEE Spectrum has noted Moskowitz's suggestion that for FCC tests that investigated only phones directly supplied by the manufacturer itself, "'it would be easy to dummy the phone with a software update' and ensure it didn’t put out enough power to exceed the SAR limit."
Bloomberg News has quoted Moskowitz's appraisals of the implications of new research studies,
the Chicago Tribune, Reader's Digest and various other media note Moskowitz as an expert,

and he has been quoted on media platforms such as Psychology Today.

Moskowitz has helped circulate a petition expressing concern about the rollout of new 5G (5th Generation) wireless technologies, as reported by media that include 
The Observer and
The Nation.
In March 2019, the British tabloid Daily Mail ran a headline that implied that the scientists' petition had singled out potential dangers from a specific product, "Apple's Airpods". Later that month, the fact-checking website Snopes published an investigation that cited Moskowitz as a source of information for reliably understanding the origins and partial inaccuracy of the Daily Mail story.

In 2017, the American Council on Science and Health, which is regarded as an "industry-friendly" group, published a profile of Moskowitz describing him as a "Cell Phone, Wi-Fi 'Truther'".
In July 2019, the Office of Communications and Public Affairs of the University of California, Berkeley, published an audio podcast plus transcript of Moskowitz's talk, "Cell Phones, Cell Towers and Wireless Safety".

Tobacco
Moskowitz has also been quoted in media coverage of cigarettes and health, one area in which he has done research. The Daily Californian quoted his statement that "the whole movement toward changing norms within our society with regards to tobacco use has been driven by people acting at the community level, creating laws."

Publications (selected)

References

External links
Electromagnetic Radiation Safety (website operated by Joel Moskowitz)
Faculty page for Joel Moskowitz
Twitter feed for Joel Moskowitz
Joel Moskowitz lecture on February 27, 2019 filmed by U.C. Berkeley University Health Service (UHS) and by CNBC
Joel Moskowitz webinar (9 May 2017) (YouTube)
International EMF Scientist Appeal (petition)

Anti-smoking activists
American health activists
Activists from the San Francisco Bay Area
Living people
University of California, Berkeley faculty
Tobacco researchers
Rutgers University alumni
University of California, Santa Barbara alumni
Year of birth missing (living people)